3rd Edge were an English boy band active in the early 2000s. Their two singles, "In and Out" and "Know You Wanna", were both top 20 hits in the UK.

Prior to joining 3rd Edge, Thomas Jules-Stock had released singles as a solo artist, with two charting in the UK; "That Kinda Guy" (1997) and "Didn't I Tell You True" (1998). After 3rd Edge, he became a songwriter and session singer and has worked with artists such as Wiley, Crookers, Simon Webbe, Professor Green and Rudimental and featured on 2Play's cover of "Careless Whisper", which was a No. 29 hit in 2004.

Discography

Singles
"In and Out" (2002), Parlophone - UK #15
"Know You Wanna" (2002), Parlophone - UK #17

As featured artist
"Who Are You?" - Sticky (2003), Social Circles

References

External links

English boy bands
UK garage groups
British musical trios
Musical groups established in 2001
Musical groups disestablished in 2003
Parlophone artists